Flossenbürg (Northern Bavarian: Flossenbirch) is a municipality in the district of Neustadt an der Waldnaab in Bavaria in Germany. The state-approved leisure area is located in the Bavarian Forest and borders Bohemia (the Czech Republic) in the east. During World War II, the Flossenbürg concentration camp was located here.

History 
The first reference of Flossenbürg's existence was in 948. Its castle was the Hohenstaufen's stronghold. Later, Flossenbürg belonged to the duchy of Neuburg-Sulzbach and came to the regional court of Floß in the Electorate of Bavaria in 1777. Today, it is located in the administrative region of Oberpfalz.

The town was the site of Flossenbürg concentration camp from 1938 until 1945. On April 23, 1945, the U.S. 90th Infantry Division of the 3rd Army liberated the camp and took it without any fighting.

Transport 
Flossenbürg was the terminus of the Floß–Flossenbürg railway line that branched off in Floß from the Neustadt (Waldnaab)–Eslarn railway and is served today by a bus route from Weiden via Neustadt an der Waldnaab to the Silberhütte Cross-Country Skiing Centre.

References 

Neustadt an der Waldnaab (district)
Upper Palatine Forest